Chen Kingkwan (3 January 1913 – 1 May 2000) was a Chinese sprinter. He competed in the men's 100 metres at the 1936 Summer Olympics.

References

1913 births
2000 deaths
Athletes (track and field) at the 1936 Summer Olympics
Chinese male sprinters
Olympic athletes of China
Place of birth missing
Runners from Shanghai
People of the Republic of China